Walnut Street Commercial Historic District is a national historic district located at Springfield, Greene County, Missouri. The district encompasses seven contributing buildings in a commercial section of Springfield. The district developed between about 1895 and 1949, and includes representative examples of Italianate and Colonial Revival style architecture.  Located in the district is the separately listed Landers Theater.  Other notable buildings include the Masonic Temple (1906).

It was added to the National Register of Historic Places in 1999.

References

Historic districts on the National Register of Historic Places in Missouri
Italianate architecture in Missouri
Colonial Revival architecture in Missouri
Buildings and structures in Springfield, Missouri
National Register of Historic Places in Greene County, Missouri